Steven Suskin is an American theater critic and historian of musical theater. He is a member emeritus of the New York Drama Critics' Circle.

Bibliography

References

American critics
Living people
Music historians
Year of birth missing (living people)